Dhone revenue division is an administrative division in Nandyal district in the Indian state of Andhra Pradesh. It is one of the three revenue divisions in the district and has 6 mandals under its administration. Dhone is the headquarters of this division.

History 
Dhone revenue division was formed on 4 April 2022 by the Government of Andhra Pradesh, along with the newly formed Nandyal district as part of reorganization of districts in the state.

Administration 

This revenue division contains 6 mandals under its administration which include:

See also 
List of revenue divisions in Andhra Pradesh
Atmakur revenue division
Nandyal revenue division

References

Revenue divisions in Nandyal district